Kat Corbett is an American disc jockey, voice artist and writer. Currently a host on two channels at SiriusXM including Lithium since 2016 with the addition of Pop Rocks in 2022. Kat's radio career really took off at legendary Los Angeles radio outlet KROQ when she hosted middays from 2005-2020. Simultaneously she hosted and programmed the legendary new music show 'Locals Only' on KROQ for nearly twenty years. Locals Only pushed unknown artists in the spotlight and sent them on their way to bigger things. Artists like Billie Eilish, Silversun Pickups, Fitz and the Tantrums, Katie Perry, Awolnation, The Dirty Heads, Grouplove, Capital Cites, Young the Giant, Local Natives and many more all got their shot on KROQ Locals Only.

Corbett's voiceover work includes clients Mercedes Benz and MTV as well as the Fox Sports promo voice for the FIFA World Cup from 2015 and 2022. She served as the music supervisor for the television series Sweet/Vicious in 2016 and 2017.

Corbett began her radio career at indie alternative station WFNX in Boston. While on-air at WFNX Kat also worked for legendary concert promoter Don Law where she learned the ins and out of the live music industry.

In addition to radio, Kat Corbett is a writer who earned a semifinalist position in the prestigious Academy Nicholl Fellowship competition in 2020. She is currently preparing a series of short stories to be released later in 2023.

References

Year of birth missing (living people)
Living people
American women DJs
American voice actresses
21st-century American women